Olga Novo (born 1975 in Vilarmao, A Pobra do Brollón) is a Galician poet and essayist.

She studied Galician Philology at the University of Santiago de Compostela and was a high school teacher in several Galician centres, and a Galician literature professor at the University of Southern Brittany, in Lorient.

She has published her works and essays in several publications (Festa da Palabra Silenciada, Dorna, Xistral, El País, ABC…).

Works
Magnalia, with the painter Alexandra Domínguez and the poet Xoán Abeleira.

Poetry
A teta sobre o sol (1996)
Nós nus (1997)
A cousa vermella (2004)
Cráter (2011)

Essay
Por un vocabulario galego do sexo. A terminoloxía erótica de Claudio Rodriguez Fer (1995)
O lume vital de Claudio Rodriguez Fer (1999, 2008)
Uxío Novoneyra. Lingua loaira (2005)
Introdución a Unha tempada no paraíso de Claudio Rodríguez Fer (2010)
Erótica Medieval Galaica (2013)
No principio foi o pracer (2017)

Translations
El contradiscurso de las mujeres. Historia del proceso feminista, by Carmen Blanco.

Prizes
Ánxel Fole Award of research Uxío Novoneyra. Lingua loaira.
Losada Diéguez Award, Nós nus.

External links
Ficha da autora na Biblioteca Virtual Galega
The Barcelona Review

1975 births
Living people
20th-century Spanish painters
21st-century Spanish painters
Spanish women poets
Writers from Galicia (Spain)
Galician-language writers
Spanish women essayists
20th-century Spanish poets
20th-century Spanish women writers
Women writers from Galicia (Spain)
20th-century essayists